The 2004–05 Eastern Counties Football League season was the 63rd in the history of Eastern Counties Football League a football competition in England.

Premier Division

The Premier Division featured 19 clubs which competed in the division last season, along with three new clubs, promoted from Division One:
Cambridge City reserves
Harwich & Parkeston
Leiston

League table

Division One

Division One featured 16 clubs which competed in the division last season, along with four new clubs:
Fakenham Town, relegated from the Premier Division
Saffron Walden Town, returned to league system after leaving Essex Senior League in 2003
Tiptree United, relegated from the Premier Division
Walsham-le-Willows, joined from the Suffolk and Ipswich League

League table

References

External links
 Eastern Counties Football League

2004-05
9